Lee Sung-soo (also spelled Lee Sung-su; born November 3, 1979) is a South Korean music production director and A&R executive. He is the current CEO of SM Entertainment and has formerly served as head of the production division and CEO of SM Entertainment USA. Lee began working for SM as early as 1998 as a part-timer and officially joined the agency in 2005 as an A&R representative. 

Lee is an expert in the field of music production and is considered one of the key figures who has led the growth of SM. He was in charge of producing music, was a member of the company's core organization of A&R, and has been responsible for the songs and concepts of SM's artists such as BoA, Girls' Generation, Shinee, Exo, Red Velvet, and NCT.

Life and career 
Born on November 3, 1979, Lee Sung-soo graduated from the Department of International Trade at Hankuk University of Foreign Studies. He is the nephew of SM founder Lee Soo-man's late wife. Lee began working for SM Entertainment as early as 1998 while attending university as a part-timer focused on various tasks, such as identifying fan club trends. He developed an interest in A&R and attended the SM Academy, where he studied computer composition and arrangement, stating that he should "know how to make music to be good at A&R". He later wrote two songs for Shinee: "Romeo and Juliette" and "The Name I Loved". He officially joined SM in 2005 as a member of the A&R department and worked with Chinese singer Zhang Liyin as his first project. He also had experience of working with a thin-film transistor (TFT) as part of research and development (R&D) work to create music videos and content using 3D videos, a "special" project of Lee Soo-man. He became head of the A&R department in 2008 and head of the production division in 2015, directly under Lee Soo-man. By that point, he was directing 80 percent of artist production. 

As part of his role as an A&R director, Lee stayed abroad for a third of the year and formed a "strong" network with foreign composers, hosting songwriting camps for SM with them and the company's in-house composers. He had first started teaming up with foreign composers in the early 2000s. He did not know anything beforehand and stated that he just "recklessly" participated in music events held abroad and started looking for composers. Over the years, he checked and selected talented composers and compiled them into a list, and within SM, they formed a studio that could operate a songwriting camp all year round. He was also responsible for the creation of SM Station and SM Classics.

Lee was appointed a registered director in 2017 and became CEO of SM Entertainment USA in 2019. On March 10, 2020, SM announced through the board of directors that Lee Sung-soo, general director of music production, and Tak Young-jun, general director of artist management, had been appointed co-CEOs of the company. Through the announcement of the company's appointment of two new executives, Lee was appointed as the chief executive officer (CEO), with Tak as the chief marketing officer (CMO), as SM celebrated its 25th year.

In 2023, Lee and Tak became embroiled in a dispute over SM's management rights with founder Lee Soo-man. After being pushed out of the company due to shareholder outrage over high producing fees, Lee Soo-man sold his shares to Hybe Corporation, making them the largest shareholder. Lee and Tak, who had been planning to restructure the company, allied themselves with technology company Kakao in an effort to guarantee SM's independence. On March 12, Hybe withdrew from the takeover battle, ceding control of SM's managements rights to Kakao. Lee announced his intention to stand down as CEO and return to his role in A&R.

Keynote speeches

Filmography

Accolades 
SM Entertainment was selected in the job creation category of the Korea Creative Management 2020 award for two consecutive years. Lee Sung-soo was mentioned as having a pivotal role in establishing SM as a "leading entertainment company in Asia," adding that Lee maintained the company's musical color and completeness due to operating and developing his system with producer Lee Soo-man since the mid-2000s. Lee was listed along with Tak Young-jun in Billboard'''s 2022 International Power Players. Additionally, Lee was on the list of Billboard'''s 2022 Indie Power Players, along with Tak, with Lee expressing his satisfaction with their achievement being noticed as the "trailblazers in the global music industry during such an exciting time for K-pop."

Notes

References 

1979 births
Living people
Hankuk University of Foreign Studies alumni
A&R people
Music directors
South Korean chief executives
South Korean music industry executives
SM Entertainment people